Jean Gordon (February 4, 1915 – January 8, 1946) was an American socialite and a Red Cross worker during World War II. A niece by marriage of General George S. Patton, some writers claim she had a long affair with Patton, allegedly beginning years before the war and continuing behind the front lines of wartime Europe. The published memoirs of Gordon's good friend, Patton's daughter Ruth Ellen, who also collaborated on her nephew Robert's work on the Pattons, as well as correspondence from Patton's wife, Beatrice, reveals that the family considered Gordon and Patton to have been in a romantic relationship. Patton's scholarly biographers disagree.  After her lover (a junior officer) returned to his wife, and shortly after Patton died, she committed suicide.

Early life
Jean Gordon's mother, Louise Raynor Ayer, daughter of the textile industrialist Frederick Ayer and his first wife Cornelia Wheaton, was a half-sister of Patton's wife Beatrice. Her father Donald Gordon, a well-known Boston lawyer, died of leukemia when Jean was 8 years old. Gordon, described as "a quiet but witty girl, highly intelligent and beautiful," and "a vivacious and lovely brunette," was prominent in prewar Boston high society, being a member of women's organizations such as the Junior League and the Vincent Club. The same age as Patton's younger daughter Ruth Ellen and her best friend, she spent many of her vacations with the Pattons and was a bridesmaid in the weddings of both Patton girls.

World War II
After completing the Red Cross nurse's aide training course early in the war, Jean Gordon volunteered in several Boston hospitals, serving for a while as vice-chairman of the Boston Red Cross Volunteer Nurse's Aide Corps, before being sent to England in May 1944 as a Red Cross staff assistant. She contacted Patton early in July, and he visited her in London shortly before departing for Normandy. He later told General Everett Hughes, his close friend serving on Eisenhower's staff, that he wanted to keep her presence a secret. When Hughes wondered about their relationship, Patton, "more boastful than repentant," told him that Jean had "been mine for 12 years," which would mean that they had been involved from the time she was 17 years old and a frequent guest of Ruth Ellen. Gordon was assigned to the ARC Clubmobile group L attached to the Third Army headquarters as a "donut girl", a volunteer who served donuts, coffee, and cigarettes to front-line troops, as well as diverting them with music, dance, and chat. She would become Patton’s constant companion and his hostess when he entertained guests at his headquarters. The two of them would converse animatedly with each other in fluent French, to the confusion of those around them. Patton made a practice of inviting the Red Cross girls to dine with his staff, especially when dignitaries, such as General Eisenhower, visited his headquarters, and they also had Patton to dinner several times. Once the war was over, the girls became even more a part of his entourage.

Postwar
According to Everett Hughes, Patton had quarreled with Jean Gordon not long before Hughes visited his headquarters early in May 1945; perhaps, he thought, about what would become of her now. Soon, however, they had made up, and apparently renewed their liaison during Patton's leave in England a while later. In June, Patton returned to the United States for a month-long bond drive. After seeing him off, Hughes took the distraught Jean back to his apartment so she could "have a good cry." She returned to the United States in December 1945 on the M.S. Gripsholm.

Dispute over the relationship with Patton
Patton repeatedly boasted of his sexual success with Gordon, but his biographers do not find it credible. Stanley  Hirshson states that the relationship was casual.  Dennis Showalter believes that Patton, under severe physical and psychological stress, made up claims of sexual conquest to prove his virility.  Carlo D'Este agrees, saying, "His behavior suggests that in both 1936 [in Hawaii] and 1944–45, the presence of the young and attractive Jean was a means of assuaging the anxieties of a middle-aged man troubled over his virility and a fear of aging."

Jean Gordon's supervisor, Betty South, the captain of the ARC Clubmobile crew attached to the Third Army headquarters, claimed that although Gordon adored General Patton, it was strictly in a father–daughter relationship, while the man she truly loved was a young married captain who left her despondent when he went home to his wife. However, her version is colored by the fact that she was protective of both Patton's and Gordon's reputation.

Ruth Ellen Patton has initially also staunchly denied the rumors of an affair, Yet her posthumously published memoirs, as well as her nephew Robert's work on the Pattons she collaborated on, reveal that the family considered Gordon and Patton to have been in a romantic relationship. In fact, according to the noted film and military historian Lawrence Suid, the fear that a movie might portray the extramarital affair was a major contributing factor to their ongoing opposition to any production.

When Patton's family invited the military historian Martin Blumenson to edit Patton's papers, he handled the issue of the rumored affair with reticence. He concludes: "When Betty [South, after Patton's death] telephoned Jean to express her sorrow... Jean said, 'I think it is better this way for Uncle Georgie. There is no place for him any more, and he would have been unhappy with nothing to do.' Jean took her own life in New York early in January 1946, little more than two weeks after Patton died. Some thought she did so in despair over her uncle's demise. Others believed she was hopelessly in love with a young married officer. Whatever she had been to Patton before the war, during the conflict, and afterward, she helped to sustain and support him. Immediately after the war was over, when he... had no place to go in the army, he needed all the help he could get."

David Irving used General Hughes' wartime diary, which contains multiple references to Patton's intimate relationship with Gordon, to write about the affair in his 1981 book The War between the Generals. It had been available in the Library of Congress since 1958, but was not studied due to Hughes' illegible handwriting. However, since in 1980 Irving hired the handwriting expert Molly McClellan to decipher it and transcribe its 900 pages, most historians have used the diary as a source, while refraining from giving a definite verdict on the nature of the relationship.

Death
Beatrice Patton clearly believed that Jean Gordon was intimately involved with her husband and wrote to him repeatedly to express her concerns, prompting his cavalier dismissals and a denial that he had even seen her. The evening before he left for his bond-raising tour, during a farewell dinner at the Ritz, Patton confessed to Everett Hughes that he was "scared to death of going back home to America;" and upon his return told Hughes: "Beatrice gave me hell. I'm glad to be in Europe!" Shortly after Patton died of injuries sustained in a car crash that had left him paralyzed, his wife arranged to meet Gordon at a Boston hotel where she confronted her over the supposed affair. In the early morning of January 8, 1946, only days after the confrontation with Beatrice and a little more than two weeks after Patton's death, Jean Gordon committed suicide, surrounded by General Patton's pictures, in the Upper East Side Manhattan apartment of a friend.
In closing his account of the confrontation preceding Gordon's death, Patton's biographer Carlo D'Este writes: "Beatrice's jealousy of Jean Gordon was that of an older woman for a young and attractive mistress who has stolen her husband's interest... Jean told a friend that... with the war now over, perhaps Patton's death had been a blessing in disguise. [Robert Patton writes that she] 'had an understanding of him that was insightful and not frivolous, ample reason for his wife to deem her a serious rival. Beatrice, out of love, could forgive Georgie's indiscretion, but Jean she was determined to punish.'"

See also

Kay Summersby – Dwight D. Eisenhower's Mechanised Transport Corps driver

Bibliography
Footnotes

Notes

References
- Total pages: 889 
 - Total pages: 977 
 
 - Total pages: 400 
 - Total pages: 352 
- Total pages: 748 
 - Total pages: 672 
- Total pages: 224
 – Total pages: 357 
 - Total pages: 320 
 - Total pages: 304   
 - Total pages: 177  
 - Total pages: 322 

1915 births
1946 suicides
American Red Cross personnel
American women civilians in World War II
George S. Patton
People from Boston
Suicides in New York City